The Mozambique Fed Cup team represents Mozambique in Fed Cup tennis competition and are governed by the Federação Moçambicana de Ténis. They have not competed since 2017.

Current squad (2017) 
 Ilga Adolfo Joao
 Claudia Sumaia
 Marieta De Lyubov Nhamitambo

History

Mozambique competed in its first Fed Cup in 2015.

See also
Mozambique Davis Cup team

External links

Billie Jean King Cup teams
Fed Cup
Fed Cup